Rata Dhotharan is a village in Hafizabad District, Punjab, Pakistan.
The population mainly consists of Dhothar Jatts.

Villages in Hafizabad District